XLR-12 is an indole-based synthetic cannabinoid drug that was invented by Abbott Laboratories in 2006. It is an analogue of XLR-11 where the 5-fluoropentyl chain has been replaced with a 4,4,4-trifluorobutyl chain. XLR-12 is relatively highly selective for the CB2 receptor, with a Ki of 0.09 nM and 167x selectivity over the related CB1 receptor, however it still retains appreciable affinity for CB1 with a Ki of 15 nM.

Legal status 
XLR-12 is illegal in Hungary and Japan.

See also 
 UR-144
 FUB-144
 JTE 7-31

References 

Cannabinoids
Designer drugs
Tetramethylcyclopropanoylindoles